Damian Michael Rolls (born September 15, 1977) is a former Major League Baseball player. He was the hitting coach for the Kansas City T-Bones.

Rolls was drafted by the Los Angeles Dodgers as the 23rd pick in the 1st round in 1996, but was claimed by the Kansas City Royals in the  Rule 5 draft and immediately traded to the Tampa Bay Devil Rays. He played all or part of the - with Tampa Bay, playing several different positions, most often as a third baseman.

Rolls was released by the Devil Rays on November 23, 2004. On January 21, 2005, he signed with the New York Yankees, but was released on May 1, 2006. Rolls signed on May 10 with the Chicago White Sox and played for their Triple-A affiliate, the Charlotte Knights. On June 7, 2006, Rolls was released after batting only .182 in 17 games. After his release, he signed with the Bridgeport Bluefish of the Atlantic League where he played well, batting .315 in 74 games.

For , Rolls signed with the Long Island Ducks, where his season was cut short by injury. He retired after the season and rejoined the team as hitting coach.

In 2011 The Rockland Boulders, an American professional baseball team based in Pomona, New York in the County of Rockland and member of the Canadian American Association of Professional Baseball hired Rolls to serve as the club’s hitting coach for the 2011 season.

External links
, MILB, or Retrosheet, or Pelota Binaria (Venezuelan Winter League)

1977 births
Living people
African-American baseball players
Baseball players from Kansas
Bridgeport Bluefish players
Cardenales de Lara players
American expatriate baseball players in Venezuela
Charlotte Knights players
Columbus Clippers players
Durham Bulls players
Kansas City T-Bones players
Long Island Ducks players
Major League Baseball infielders
Major League Baseball outfielders
Orlando Rays players
San Antonio Missions players
Savannah Sand Gnats players
Sportspeople from Manhattan, Kansas
St. Petersburg Devil Rays players
Tampa Bay Devil Rays players
Vero Beach Dodgers players
Yakima Bears players
21st-century African-American sportspeople
20th-century African-American sportspeople